The Centre des monuments nationaux (CMN) (French, 'National monuments centre') is a French government body (Établissement public à caractère administratif) which conserves, restores and manages historic buildings and sites that are the property of the French state. It is run by the Ministry of Culture.

The CMN is responsible for the upkeep of around 85 monuments, ranging from the prehistoric megaliths at Carnac, medieval fortifications such as the towers at La Rochelle, and Renaissance châteaux such as Azay-le-Rideau, to Le Corbusier's Villa Savoye. The CMN is also responsible for making these monuments accessible to the public, and promoting understanding of the heritage they represent through publishing books and guides, under the imprint Éditions du patrimoine.

In 2008, the CMN sites had a total of nearly 8.5 million visitors. The CMN had an annual budget of €120 million in 2009, which was mainly derived from its own sales, as well as from donations and a subsidy from the Ministry of Culture. The organisation is based at the Hôtel de Sully on rue Saint-Antoine in Paris.

List of monuments

References

External links
Official website

Government agencies of France
Lists of buildings and structures in France
Historic sites in France
National heritage organizations